Svend Axelsson  (born 5 May 1937 in Hadsund) is a Danish modernist architect, who for many years was a partner in KHR Architects along with Knud Holscher.

Axelsson has won numerous projects and architectural competitions in Copenhagen and the Danish Pavilion for the World Exhibition Expo 92 in Seville in 1992, for which he won the Nykredit Architecture Prize. He also won a prize in 1989 for his design of Terminal B in Copenhagen Airport. He is a member of the Federation of Danish Architects.

Major works
Architecture:with Knud Holscher
Odense University, Denmark. Competition 1967, construction 1971 onwards
Royal Theatre, Copenhagen, Denmark. 1. prize, competition 1979. Not built.
Bahrain National Museum, Bahrain, 1982–1988
Copenhagen Airport, Terminal B, Denmark, 1986
Copenhagen Airport, Domestic Terminal, Denmark, 1988–1989

See also
List of Danish architects

References

21st-century Danish architects
1937 births
Living people
People from Hadsund
Recipients of the Eckersberg Medal